Tunzha (Tunĵı) is a rural locality (a selo) in Paspaulskoye Rural Settlement of Choysky District, the Altai Republic, Russia. The population was 256 as of 2016. There are 42 streets.

Geography 
Tunzha is located east from Gorno-Altaysk, in the valley of the Malaya Isha River, 6 km west of Choya (the district's administrative centre) by road. Choya is the nearest rural locality.

References 

Rural localities in Choysky District